Julodis onopordi is a species of beetles belonging to the Buprestidae family.

Description
The coloration is metallic green.

Distribution
This species occurs in France, Portugal, Spain, Sicily (Lampedusa) and in Egypt, Libya, Tunisia, Algeria, Morocco.

List of Subspecies 
 Julodis onopordi chalcostigma Chevrolat, 1860
 Julodis onopordi longiseta Abeille de Perrin, 1904
 Julodis onopordi onopordi (Fabricius, 1787)
 Julodis onopordi sommeri Jaubert, 1858
 Julodis onopordi splichali Obenberger, 1917
 Julodis onopordi lampedusanus Tassi, 1966

References

External links
 J. onopordi
 Julodis onopordi
 Universal Biological Indexer
 Biolib
 Fauna europaea

Buprestidae
Beetles described in 1787